Aleksandra Konieczna (born 13 October 1965) is a Polish film and stage actress. She is a three-time Polish Film Award winner for her roles in The Last Family (2016), A Cat with a Dog (2018) and Corpus Christi (2019). Her television credits include Na Wspólnej (2008–present), Diagnosis (2017–2018) and Belfer (2017).

Biography 
She graduated from the Adam Mickiewicz High School No. 1 in Prudnik. In 1988, she graduated from the Aleksander Zelwerowicz National Academy of Dramatic Art in Warsaw.

She performed on stage at Warsaw Teatr Współczesny (Modern Theatre; 1988–1990), Warsaw Dramatic Theatre (1990–2000), and later at Warsaw Variety Theatre. In 2000, she received a Polish Radio Festival Award for her role in the radio play Dorra directed by Andrzej Piszczatowski. In 2006, she received an acting award at the Polish Radio and Polish Television Theatre Festival "Two Theatres" in Sopot for her role in the television play Skaza directed by Marcin Wrona, based on the Marzena Broda's drama of the same name.

Her role as Honorata in the soap opera Na Wspólnej (since 2008) brought her popularity. For the role of Zofia Beksińska in the film The Last Family (2016) she was awarded the Polish Academy Award for Best Actress and an award for leading female role at the 41st Gdynia Film Festival. She played Dr Maria Kaleta in the television series Diagnosis between 2017 and 2018. In 2017, she won the Grand Prix of the "Two Theatres" festival for her role in the television play Clean Up.

In 2018, she played Polish actress and singer Iga Cembrzyńska in Janusz Kondratiuk's autobiographical film A Cat with a Dog, which depicts the director's last year spent together with his brother Andrzej (Iga's husband) before his death. For her performance, Konieczna was awarded Polish Academy Award for Best Supporting Actress and the award for supporting female role at the 43rd Gdynia Film Festival. She then played Lidia in Jan Komasa's Academy Award-nominated film Corpus Christi (2019) which earned Koniczna her second Polish Academy Award for Best Actress. She received her second Gdynia Film Festival award for best supporting actress for her role in Sweat (2020).

Filmography

Film

Television

External links 
 

Polish film actresses
Polish television actresses
Living people
1965 births
People from Prudnik
Polish stage actresses